Matthew Opoku Prempeh, (born 23 May 1968) is a Ghanaian medical doctor and politician. He is a member of the New Patriotic Party and a Member of Parliament for Manhyia South Constituency in the Ashanti Region of Ghana.  He is a former Minister of Education. He is popularly known as NAPO. He is currently the Minister for Energy.

Early life and education 
Prempeh was born on 23 May 1968 and hails from Pakyi No 2 in the Ashanti Region. He studied Human Biology and Medicine at Kwame Nkrumah University of Science and Technology, later continuing post-graduate studies at the Netherlands Institute of Health Sciences and the Kennedy School of Government at Harvard University.

Career 
Prior to parliament, Prempeh served as CEO of Keyedmap Security Services Limited from 2004 to 2009. He is also a medical doctor  and served as a member of the Royal College of Physicians and Surgeons of the United Kingdom from 1999 to 2003.

Politics

Member of parliament 
As a Ghana parliamentarian, he represents Manhyia South in Kumasi, formerly representing Manhyia. He was first elected to parliament in 2008 and is a member of the New Patriotic Party. In 2016, he was re-elected with 35,958 votes, or 87.17% of the votes cast in the district.  He was a member of the health committee and appointments committee. Prempeh contested the 2020 Ghanaian general election as a parliamentary candidate for the Manhyia South constituency, under the banner of the New Patriotic Party and won by a large margin.

Minister of Education 
He was appointed by President Nana Akufo-Addo on 10 January 2017 to serve as Minister for Education of Ghana. He served in that role for 4 years till 6 January 2021 when the tenure of office of the president and his ministers ended.

In May 2017, President Nana Akufo-Addo named Prempeh as part of the nineteen ministers who would form his cabinet. The names of the 19 ministers were submitted the Parliament of Ghana and announced by the Speaker of the House, Mike Ocquaye. As a Cabinet minister, Prempeh was part of the inner circle of the president and was to aid in key decision-making activities in the country.

Prempeh also contributed to the educational sector of Ghana as a Minister of Education such as improving the infrastructure and promoting vocational and technical education (TVET) and leading the government's flagship programme ''FREE SHS''.

Committees 
Prempeh is a member of the Defense and Interior Committee and also a member of the Appointments Committee.

Personal life 
He identifies as a Christian and is a grandson of the former Ghanaian president, John Kufuor.  He is divorced.

In May 2022, a group by name Friends of NAPO presented some educational materials to schools in the Manhyia South Constituency to mark his 54th birthday.

References

1968 births
Living people
Education ministers of Ghana
Kwame Nkrumah University of Science and Technology alumni
Cabinet Ministers of Ghana
Ghanaian MPs 2009–2013
Ghanaian MPs 2013–2017
Ghanaian MPs 2017–2021
Prempeh College alumni
Ghanaian MPs 2021–2025
Ghanaian medical doctors
New Patriotic Party politicians
Ghanaian politicians